Bodmiscombe Preceptory was a priory in Devon, England. It was run by the Knights Hospitaller and was possibly founded during the reign on Henry III and dissolved into Buckland Abbey in the 15th century.

References

Monasteries in Devon